In mathematics, the lemniscate constant  is a transcendental mathematical constant that is the ratio of the perimeter of Bernoulli's lemniscate to its diameter, analogous to the definition of  for the circle. The lemniscate constant is closely related to the lemniscate elliptic functions and approximately equal to 2.62205755.

John Todd named two more lemniscate constants, the first lemniscate constant  and the second lemniscate constant .

History 

By 1799, Gauss had two proofs of the theorem that  where  is the lemniscate constant.

The lemniscate constant  and first lemniscate constant  were proven transcendental by Theodor Schneider in 1937 and the second lemniscate constant  and Gauss's constant  were proven transcendental by Theodor Schneider in 1941. In fact,

Forms 

Usually,  is defined by the first equality below.

The lemniscate constant can also be computed by the arithmetic–geometric mean ,

Moreover,

which is analogous to

Gauss's constant is typically defined as the reciprocal of the arithmetic–geometric mean of 1 and the square root of 2, after his calculation of  published in 1800:

Gauss's constant is equal to

where Β denotes the beta function. A formula for G in terms of  Jacobi theta functions is given by

Gauss's constant may be computed from the gamma function at argument :

John Todd's lemniscate constants may be given in terms of the beta function B:

Series 
Viète's formula for  can be written:

A related result for Gauss's constant is:

An infinite series of Gauss's constant discovered by Gauss is:

Euler's formula .

The lemniscate constant can be rapidly computed by the series

where  (these are the generalized pentagonal numbers).

In a spirit similar to that of the Basel problem,

A related result is

where  is the sum of positive divisors function.

In 1842, Malmsten found

where  is Euler's constant.

Gauss's constant is given by the rapidly converging series

The constant is also given by the infinite product

Continued fractions 

Define Brouncker's continued fraction by

Let  except for the first equality where . Then

For example,

Simple continued fractions

Integrals 

 is related to the area under the curve . Defining , twice the area in the positive quadrant under the curve  is  In the quartic case, 

In 1842, Malmsten discovered that

Furthermore,

and

a form of Gaussian integral.

Gauss's constant appears in the evaluation of the integrals

The first and second lemniscate constants are defined by integrals:

Circumference of an ellipse 

Gauss's constant satisfies the equation

Euler discovered in 1738 that for the rectangular elastica (first and second lemniscate constants)

Hence the full circumference is

This is also the arc length of the sine curve on half a period:

Notes

References

 Sequences A014549, A053002, and A062539 in OEIS

External links 
 

Mathematical constants
Real transcendental numbers